Music of the Spheres or Musica universalis is an ancient philosophical concept that regards proportions in the movements of celestial bodies as a form of music.

Music of the Spheres may also refer to:

Literature 
 Music of the Spheres, a Star Trek novel by Margaret Wander Bonanno which was rewritten and published under the title Probe

Music

Albums
 Music of the Spheres (Coldplay album), 2021
 "Music of the Spheres", a song from the album of the same name
 "Music of the Spheres II", a song from the album of the same name
 Music of the Spheres World Tour, a 2022 concert tour promoting the album of the same name
 Music of the Spheres (Ian Brown album), 2001
 Music of the Spheres (Mike Oldfield album), 2008
 Music of the Spheres, a 2011 vinyl box set by The 13th Floor Elevators

Songs and compositions
 Music of the Spheres (German Sphärenklänge), a waltz by Josef Strauss, 1868
 Music of the Spheres (Langgaard), a 1918 composition for soprano, chorus and orchestra by Rued Langgaard
 Music of the Spheres, a 1938 composition for electronic instruments by Johanna Beyer
 Music of the Spheres, a 2004 composition for brass band by Philip Sparke
 "Music of the Spheres" (Destiny), a 2013 composition by Marty O’Donnell, Michael Salvatori and Paul McCartney for the video game Destiny

Television 
 "Music of the Spheres" (Doctor Who), a 2008 mini-episode of Doctor Who made for The Proms
 "Music of the Spheres" (The Outer Limits), a 1997 episode of The Outer Limits
 "Music of the Spheres" (Touch), an episode of Touch
 "Music of the Spheres", an episode of Clangers
 "Music of the Spheres," an episode of The Ascent of Man

Movies 
 Music of the Spheres, a 1984 science fiction movie